The 2020 Bathurst 1000 (formally known as the 2020 Supercheap Auto Bathurst 1000) was a motor racing event for Supercars that was held on the weekend of 15–18 October 2020. It was held at the Mount Panorama Circuit in Bathurst, New South Wales, Australia and featured a single 1000 kilometre race. The event was the final race of the 2020 Supercars Championship and the final time Supercheap Auto was the naming rights sponsor, having been so since 2005, as United States-based Genuine Parts Company has acquired naming rights for both the Supercars Championship and the Bathurst 1000 starting in 2021. This was the first Bathurst 1000 in history to run with a limited crowd capacity, due to the COVID-19 pandemic.

After a qualifying session held on the Friday, the top 10 drivers from that session competed in the shootout where Cameron Waters from Tickford Racing claim the pole position with a time of 2:03.5592. In the race, driver pairing, Shane Van Gisbergen and Garth Tander from Triple Eight Race Engineering who started in fourth place won the race with Van Gisbergen winning his first Bathurst 1000 and Tander his fourth. Cameron Waters and Will Davison from Tickford Racing finished in second, with Walkinshaw Andretti United's Chaz Mostert and Warren Luff completing the podium in third.

Following this, Scott McLaughlin who finished fifth in the race would win his third Supercars drivers' championship finishing 451 points ahead of Waters with Van Gisbergen finishing in third. In the teams' championship, DJR Team Penske claimed the title, finishing 262 points ahead of Triple Eight, with Tickford Racing rounding out the top three.

Report

Background and impact of the COVID-19 pandemic
The event was the 63rd running of the Bathurst 1000, which was first held at the Phillip Island Grand Prix Circuit in 1960 as a 500-mile race for Australian-made standard production sedans, and marks the 60th time that the race was held at Mount Panorama. It was the 24th running of the Australian 1000 race, which was first held after the organisational split between the Australian Racing Drivers Club and V8 Supercars Australia that saw two "Bathurst 1000" races contested in both 1997 and 1998.

This was the first time since 2000 that the race was also the final round of the championship.

The 2019 winners of the race were Scott McLaughlin and Alexandre Prémat, though Premat, a Clark County, Nevada (United States) resident who is the lead instructor at driving school for premium sportscars there, was unable to compete in the race due to border restrictions imposed as a result of the COVID-19 pandemic in Australia.

Entry list
Twenty-five cars were entered in the event – 17 Holden Commodores and eight Ford Mustangs, the smallest entry list in the events' history and the first Ford and Holden-only race since 2012. In addition to the 24 regular entries, there was a single 'Wildcard' entry from the Garry Rogers Motorsport team for débutants Tyler Everingham and Jayden Ojeda from the Super2 Series. GRM had originally planned for Nathan Herne from the Australian TA2 Racing Series to race in place of Ojeda, however Herne's entry was blocked as Motorsport Australia denied him the required licence. Seven drivers made their debuts in the race – Everingham and Ojeda, championship driver Zane Goddard, Australian and World TCR driver Dylan O'Keeffe, former Super2 driver Kurt Kostecki, and current Super2 drivers Jordan Boys and Broc Feeney. With 45 Australians and 5 New Zealanders in the line-up, it marked the first grid made up of solely Antipodean drivers since 1964.

Entries with a grey background are wildcard entries which do not compete in the full championship season.

Results

Practice

Qualifying

Top 10 Shootout

Race

Notes

References

Supercheap Auto Bathurst 1000
Motorsport in Bathurst, New South Wales